Sergey Syrtsov or Sergei Syrtsov may refer to:

Sergey Syrtsov (weightlifter) (born 1966), former Soviet/Russian weightlifter
Sergey Syrtsov (politician) (1893-1937), Soviet politician